Myanmar competed in every Asian Para Games.Myanmar have won 14 overall medals at the Asian Para Games.

Asian Para Games

FESPIC Games

Asian Youth Para Games

ASEAN Para Games

See also
Myanmar at the Olympics
Myanmar at the Paralympics
Myanmar at the Asian Games
Myanmar at the Southeast Asian Games

References 

Para